You Are My Music is the sixth album by Irish singer and actress Clodagh Rodgers released in 1973 on the RCA label.

Track listing
"Carolina Days" (Junior Campbell)
"Ease Your Pain" (Hoyt Axton)
"Lean On Me" (Cobb/McCoy)
"Children Of My Mind" (Osborne)
"All Kinds Of People" (Burt Bacharach/Hal David)
"Day By Day" (Stephen Schwartz)
"You Are My Music" (Peter Gosling)
"Betcha By Golly Wow" (Bell/Creed)
"What In The World" (Peter Gosling/Keith Mansfield)
"Together We'll Make It" (Peter Gosling/Keith Mansfield)
"That's The Way I've Always Heard It Should Be" (Carly Simon)
"One Day" (Peter Gosling)

Production
Recorded at Wessex Sound Studios
Engineers - Mike Thompson & Geoff Workman
Assistant Engineer- Roger Ginsley
Conductor - Pete Smith
Mastering Engineer - Arun Chakraverty
Vocal Backing - "Three's A Crowd"
Photography - James Wedge

Clodagh Rodgers albums
1973 albums